Powis may refer to:


People
 Alfred Powis, Canadian businessperson
 Carl Powis (1928–1999), American baseball player
 Geoff Powis (1945–2001), Canadian ice hockey player
 Lynn Powis (born 1949), Canadian former ice hockey player
 Stephen Powis, National Medical Director for NHS England and professor of medicine
 William Henry Powis (1808–1836), British wood engraver
 Powis Pinder (1872–1941), British operatic baritone

Titles
 Marquess of Powis, a title in the Peerage of England
 Marchioness of Powis (disambiguation), a list of wives of marquesses of Powis 
 Earl of Powis, a title in the Peerage of England
 Countess of Powis (disambiguation), a list of wives of earls of Powis

Other uses
 Powis Street, Greenwich, London, England
 Powis Street, one of the Welsh Streets, Liverpool, England
 Powis Academy, a school merged into St Machar Academy, a secondary school in Aberdeen, Scotland

See also
 Powis Castle, British medieval castle, fortress and grand country house near Welshpool, Powys, Wales
 Powis House, a former 18th-century mansion in London, England
 Powis Square, London
 Powys (disambiguation)